Yaakov Yosef Reinman is an American Orthodox rabbi and writer, historian, and scholar. His monographs and articles have appeared in many Jewish periodicals and his study of Talmudic contractual law is a text used in yeshivas throughout the world. In authoring his Ruach Ami series, he writes under the pen name Avner Gold.

Reinman is the author of the sefer Shufra Dishtara, an analytical study of the philosophy of Talmudic contractual law, which is utilized as a text in yeshiva studies. He also co-authored the book One People, Two Worlds: A Reform rabbi and an Orthodox rabbi explore the issues that divide them with Reform Rabbi Ammiel Hirsch. A fluent speaker of several languages, Reinman has also become known as a translator for ancient Jewish texts into English.

He is a descendant of the Narol Hasidic dynasty. His first wife was the former Shlomtze Rubin of Brooklyn. He lives in Lakewood NJ with his wife Zvia, formerly of Los Angeles.

Reinman lives in Lakewood Township, New Jersey.

Ruach Ami series
In authoring the Ruach Ami series of historical novels, Reinman uses the pen name Avner Gold.
 
The Ruach Ami series focuses on the plight of the Jewish people of Europe during the middle 17th century. Although the central characters mostly hail from Poland, the series detours to many other European countries including Turkey, Spain, Austria, France, the Netherlands and the Germanic states.

There are 12 books in the Ruach Ami series:

The Promised Child
This book, one of Reinman's first, is among the shortest and most straightforward of the series.  Not much attention is paid to developing the character's personalities and the participants are often one-dimensional; either extremely good or drastically evil. the lack of "gray" characters is a recurring theme in the series, although it becomes less and less pronounced with each passing book. The book is clearly meant as a story in itself, although it also sets the stage for the books that follow.

The promised child follows Mendel Pulichever, a childless rabbi in the fictitious Polish town of Pulichev. After hoping and praying for many years, he is finally blessed with a baby, whom he names Shloime (nicknamed Shloimele by his mother). Shloime subsequently turns into a brilliant little boy and becomes the toast of the town and the heir apparent to Mendel's job as rabbi of the city. Unfortunately, the boy is kidnapped by a local priest, Zbignew Mzlateslavsky, who is a bitter man, jealous of Mendel's happiness. All of Mendel's efforts to search for the boy are fruitless as he is hidden in an orphanage and is brought up as a Catholic. Eventually, Shloime, who grows up under the name Gregor Tal, attains the rank of bishop within the Catholic church and has little memory of his early childhood.

Some 20 years later, the same Priest Mzlateslavsky has convinced the Cardinal in charge of the Krakow, Poland region that the Jews of the city should be expelled. The Cardinal decrees that there be a debate between a Rabbi and a representative of the Church on the subject of the Talmud and that the Jews would be expelled if, in his judgment, the Jewish representative loses the debate. After Mendel is chosen as the Jewish representative, Mzlateslavsky arranges for Shloime to be the Church representative, secretly savoring the idea that Shloime will defeat his own father and cause the expulsion of the Jews of Krakow.

Unfortunately for Mzlateslavsky, "Gregor" (disguised as a Jew) goes to Pulichev to scout his opponent. While talking to Mendele, the two discuss their pasts and eventually realize the truth - that they are father and son. Together, they hatch a plan to expose Mzlateslavsky at the debate. At the debate, "Gregor" announces what has happened and begs the Cardinal to spare the Jews of Krakow. Mzlateslavsky is disgraced and the Cardinal, calling the incident a manifestation of divine providence cancels the order of expulsion. Shloime and Mendel then return to Pulichev as father and son.

The story seems to be influenced by the legend of Jewish pope Andreas.

A revised and expanded edition of this book was reprinted in 2001 (126 pages).

A second revised and expanded edition of this book was reprinted in 2018 (216 pages).

The Dream
The Dream follows Shloime Pulichever after the events described in The Promised Child. Pulichever has traveled from Pulichev to study the Talmud and learn more about his Jewish heritage. When he returns to his parents’ home, Pulichever finds his mother ill and a plot afoot to discredit the Jews of the city. Eventually, it is revealed that the discredited priest Zbignew Mzlateslavsky had been poisoning Pulichevers mother and was responsible for anti-semitic sentiments which had been blossoming in the region. Although a third-person narrative, the book follows Shloime as an individual throughout the story and the reader knows as much and only as much as does Shloime as the story progresses. Like The Purple Ring (the 6th book of the series) but unlike the most of the other books in the series, this book is entirely fictional, has very little actual history and reads more like a suspense/mystery than most of the dramas played out in the series.A revised and expanded edition of this book was reprinted in 2018 (230 pages).The Year of the Sword
The third book in the series turns to a much darker era in Jewish history; the Cossack uprising of Bohdan Khmelnytsky and his hordes, during which the Cossacks murdered as many as 100,000 Jews. While attending a conference in northern Poland, Shloime and his stepson are forced to run and are almost trapped by the Cossack invasion. The story follows their exploits and they seek to survive one of the worst pogroms of all time.A revised and expanded edition of this book was reprinted in 2018 (212 pages).Twilight
Twilight, the fourth book in the series, is unlike the other books in the series in that it is almost entirely meant as a transitional book, linking the early books in the series (through the Cossack revolution) with the later books in the series that cover historical events such as the Sabbatai Zevi affair and the Spanish Inquisition. The book itself features a relatively insignificant plot of the marriage of Shloime Pulichever's stepson, but it mainly serves to explain to the reader of the series the fates and futures of various characters introduced in the series' first three books and to introduce some of those who will be key characters in future books.A revised and expanded edition of this book was reprinted in 2019 (214 pages).The Imposter
This book follows the adventures of Shabbesai Tzvi, from his early days in Smyrna, Turkey, and follows his exploits in claiming to be the Jewish Messiah. Unlike the other books in the series, which feature fictitious plots (albeit against historical backdrops), this book straddles the border between fiction and non-fiction. Although the author admits taking some poetic license at times and although there are a few fictional characters in the book, the vast majority of the information and incidents described in the book are historically accurate, based primarily on the descriptions found in Jacob Emdens' Toras Hakanaus, and Jacob Sasportass' Zizith Novel Zevi.A revised and expanded edition of this book was reprinted in 2019 (240 pages).The Purple Ring
The Purple Ring is about the effects the Shabbesai Tzvi debacle had on the Jews in far-off Poland.  A group of influential people in the Pulichev area conspire against the local Jews, using the willingness of the Jews to follow Tzvi as the Jewish king as “proof” of their disloyalty to the Polish crown.  The book is titled after the name this cabal gives itself.

The Polish general Jan Sobieski (later to become King John III Sobieski of Poland) plays a small but crucial role in the story.A revised and expanded edition of this book was reprinted in 2020 (236 pages).Envoy from Vienna
This book is a fictionalization of the  efforts of the local Jews to prevent their expulsion from Vienna (in 1758).A revised and expanded edition of this book was reprinted in 2021 (228 pages).The Marrano Prince
Leaving behind the Pulichever family almost entirely, this book follows the fictional Marrano Don Pedro Manuel Luis Domínguez de Monteverde y Saluria (the latter estate being fictional) through his arrest and prosecution by the Spanish Inquisition.A revised and expanded edition of this book was reprinted in 2021 (320 pages).The Long Road to Freedom
In 2008, Gold returned to the series with The Long Road to Freedom, published by ArtScroll. (Previous volumes in the series had been published by CIS.) The revived series is now called “The Strasbourg Saga” after the rabbinical family name of the series, who had in previous books been known as the Pulichever family. (It is possible that the true family name is Strasbourg and that Pulichever is merely derived from the place of residence of one branch of the family.The Long Road to Freedom follows the Domínguez family after the martyrdom of Don Pedro in The Marrano Prince.

Sebastián Domínguez, a young prisoner in northern Spain is forced to convert to Christianity or else be burnt alive, so Sebastián escapes with the help of his friend, dressed up as a holy hermit. Sebastián's father is then burnt alive on a stake. Afterwards, Sebastián is caught again but is released after threats and arguments and war and agreements between the Jews and the Christians.

John III Sobieski, now king of Poland, also plays a role in this story, during the Battle of Vienna.

Scandal in Amsterdam
Continuing from The Long Road to Freedom, this book follows the Domínguez family as they attempt to integrate into the Marrano community of Amsterdam.

The Fur Traders
This book is a direct continuation of ″Scandal in Amsterdam", In this book Sebastián, Amos and Immanuel go to America.

On the day before Chanukah in the year 1684, a shocking event takes place in the Bais Medrash in Amsterdam. The event leads to private accusations and confrontations and a public uproar that threatens to change the course of many lives. The complications that arise send the central characters on a hair-raising story across the Atlantic Ocean and into the wilds of Indian country on upstate New York.

The story in the Bais Medrash [Chapter 2] is based on an event that the author actually witnessed.

 Midnight Intruders 
The two men fled through the devastated Jewish quarter of Budapest as the blazing cannons of the Austrian army rained down death and destruction. One of these men was Rabbi Tzvi Ashkenazi, the young genius who would one day become known as Chacham Tzvi, the gadol hador, the greatest rabbi of his generation. The other was Rabbi Amos Strasbourg. Together, they experienced tragedy and mortal danger, and the friendship they formed lasted a lifetime.Midnight Intruders follows the parallel trajectories of Chacham Tzvi's stormy life and insidious plots of Nechemiah Chayun, an outspoken disciple of the messianic impostor Shabbesai Tzvi. The story reaches its harrowing climax when the two clash in Amsterdam, resulting in one of the greatest communal uproars in the annals of European Jewry. Neighbor turns against neighbor, friend against friend and brother against brother as the raucous battles spill over from the synagogues into the streets. This fast-moving book features adventure, drama, mystery, conflict and, above all, a riveting and inspiring portrait of one of the greatest rabbis of modern Jewish history.

Midnight Intruders is an exciting new phase in the ongoing Strasbourg Saga as it presents for the first time a gadol of such stature. The narrative of this historical novel blends the documented facts of Chacham Tzvi's activities with those of fictional characters. The information about Chacham Tzvi is drawn from Megillas Sefer, the autobiography of his son, Rabbi Yaakov Emden, whose own story [it is claimed] will be featured in forthcoming volumes of the Saga.

Book collaboration
In 2000 a literary agent introduced Rabbi Reinman to Rabbi Ammiel Hirsch, a Reform rabbi and executive director of the Association of Reform Zionists of America (ARZA), with the idea of collaborating on a book airing the Orthodox and Reform viewpoints on various issues. Their email correspondence over the next 18 months resulted in the book One People, Two Worlds: A Reform rabbi and an Orthodox rabbi explore the issues that divide them''. The book was hailed by the religious left as a breakthrough in Orthodox recognition of religious pluralism, while generating criticism in Orthodox circles for Reinman's willingness to conduct an official rabbinic dialogue with Reform. The book was denounced by the Moetzes Gedolei HaTorah of Agudath Israel of America and the heads of Beth Medrash Govoha, Lakewood, New Jersey, where Reinman received his rabbinic ordination. Reinman subsequently pulled out of a 14-city promotional tour after two appearances, leaving Hirsch to continue the tour on his own.

References

External links
The Promised Child online
Ruach Ami Series returns- Artscroll

Year of birth missing (living people)
Living people
Writers from New Jersey
American Haredi rabbis
People from Lakewood Township, New Jersey
Jewish American writers
21st-century American Jews